Kanchanpur Union is a union parishad under Harirampur Upazila of Manikganj District in the Dhaka Division of central Bangladesh.

Geography
Kanchanpur is situated on the east bank of the Padma River.

Demographics
According to the 2011 Bangladesh census, Kanchanpur Union had 1,284 households and a population of 5,271. The literacy rate (age 7 and over) was 36.4%, compared to the national average of 51.8%. 93.8% of the employed population was engaged in agricultural work.

References

Manikganj District